Frederikssundsvej is a major artery in the North-West, Brønshøj and Husum districts of Copenhagen, Denmark. It begins at Nørrebro Station as the direct continuation of Nørrebrogade and changes its name to Herlev Hovedgade and then Skovlunde Byvej, Ballerup Byvej and Måløv Byvej before reaching the town of Frederikssund.

History
 
The street originates in the old road between Copenhagen and Frederikssund. It began at the Hyttebro, a bridge across the Lygte stream (Lygteåen) which then marked the boundary between Copenhagen and the civil parish of Brønshøj-Husum. Lygtekroen, a roadside inn frequented by travelers to and from Copenhagen, was located close to the bridge. The road passed the villages of Brønshøj, Herlev and Islev on the way to Frederikssund.

In 1901, Brønshøj-Husum was merged into Copenhagen. The Lygte stream was covered and the Lygte inn was demolished in 1904.

Notable buildings
 
Capernaum Church (No. 45), a Church of Denmark parish church, is from 1895 and was designed by Valdemar Koch. Frederikssundsvej School (No. 77-79) closed in June 2008. The building is from 1904 and was designed by city architect Ludvig Fenger. 

 
P. Ipsens Enke, a ceramics manufacturing company founded by Peter Ipsen in 1843 and later continued by his widow and son, was located at No. 78. The building at No. 78A, a former charity called Poul Fechtels Hospital, is from 1908. The charity was, however, founded as far back as 1460. It had until then been located at Møntergade.

The Hulgårds Plads housing estate is from 1944-46 and was designed by city architect Hans Christian Hansen. The local fire station, Tornegårdens Brandstation,  is located at No. 83B, It is from 1907 and was designed by Hans Wright.

Public art
 
A bronze cast of Otto Evens' 1854 sculpture Boy With Goat stands at the corner of Frederikssundsvej and Tranevej.

Parks and public spaces
Brønshøj Plads and Husum Plads, the two central public spaces of Brønshøj and Husum, are both located off the street. A number of parks and other greenspaces are also situated along the street. These include Brønshøj Park, Bellahøj, Brønshøj Cemetery, Herlev Bypark and the former military rampart Vestvolden with its moat Fæstningskanalen.

Notable people
 Hans Hedtoft (1947-50 og 1953-55) lived with his wife Ella and their three children on Frederikssundsvej at Hyrdevangen before purchasing a house at Fuglsang Allé 63 in Brønshøj.

See also
 Rentemestervej

References

External links

 Source

Streets in Bispebjerg